Barton City Township is one of fifteen townships that make up Barton County, Missouri, USA.  As of the 2000 census, its population was 256.

The township was named after the community of Barton City, now known as Hannon.

Geography
According to the USGS, it contains one cemetery, Barton City.

References

 USGS Geographic Names Information System (GNIS)

External links
 US-Counties.com
 City-Data.com

Townships in Barton County, Missouri
Townships in Missouri